Cait or Cat was a Pictish kingdom originating c. AD 800 during the Early Middle Ages. It was centered in what is now Caithness in northern Scotland. It was, according to Pictish legend, founded by Caitt (or Cat), one of the seven sons of the ancestor figure Cruithne. The territory of Cait covered not only modern Caithness, but also southeast Sutherland.

The place name Caithness derives from Cait, which is also preserved in the Gaelic name for Sutherland, in several specific names within that county and in the earliest recorded name for Shetland (meaning "islands of the Cat people").

Watson (1994) compared this usage with the early Irish  (islands of the boars) for Orkney and concluded that these are tribal names based on animals.

History

See also 
Fortriu
Kingdom of Ce
Scotland in the Early Middle Ages

References 

Picts
Celtic kingdoms
Former monarchies of Europe
Cait
Caithness
Cats in popular culture
Pictish territories